Vladimir Richard (born March 15, 1987) is a former American football player. He played on the offensive line for the University of Tennessee. He was signed as a free agent by the Tampa Bay Buccaneers in 2010.

External links
 Jacksonville Sharks Bio
Just Sports Stats

1987 births
Living people
American football offensive guards
Sportspeople from Broward County, Florida
Tennessee Volunteers football players
Tampa Bay Buccaneers players
Spokane Shock players
Jacksonville Sharks players
People from Sunrise, Florida
Players of American football from Florida